The Oval Superstars Tour (also known as OST) is a New Zealand based dirt track racing series, with championship rounds held throughout the North Island. Founded in 2013, the tour has grown to become a consistent fixture on the New Zealand Speedway calendar.

Heading into its eighth season in 2020–21, the tour had five different champions in five years, before Shane Dewar went back to back in the last two tours.

Origins 
The proposal for a national series for the Minisprint class of Speedway in New Zealand was originally conceived at the end of the 2012–13 season. There was an obvious need for a more organised calendar of events for the class in order to promote it further. Drivers supported the idea and concept of what could be achieved was soon in circulation. The following season the Oval Superstars Tour was launched, staging five events throughout the North Island.

Sporting regulations
The OST is run at venues licensed by Speedway New Zealand, the major governing body of Speedway in NZ.

Race day format
In most cases, an OST event consists of the field of cars being split into three even groups. There are three qualifying heats to sort the grid for the Main Event. In each heat, two groups will take part, with the grids ordered to give all drivers a fair chance across the night. As an example, Heat One is Group 1 & 2, Heat Two is Group 1 & 3 & Heat Three is Group 2 & 3. Drivers receive grid points for the race results, with first place taking 24, second 23, third 22 and so on.

Following qualifying, driver's grids for the Main Event are determined by their grid points, with the highest points scorers starting at the front. Main Events are usually 20 laps in distance, except for the tour's annual premier event the Windy City Showdown, which in competed for over 30 laps.

Championship points system
Drivers will earn championship points in heat races if they finish inside the top 10 positions, or in the Main Event if they finished inside the top 12. All drivers arriving at an event also receive 15 bonus points regardless of finishing position.

Heat points: 1st: 15, 2nd: 12, 3rd: 10, 4th: 8, 5th: 6, 6th: 5, 7th: 4, 8th: 3, 9th: 2, 10th: 1
Main Event points: 1st: 25, 2nd: 18, 3rd: 15, 4th: 12, 5th: 10, 6th: 8, 7th: 6, 8th: 5, 9th: 5, 10th: 3, 11th: 2, 12th: 1

Cars 
The Oval Superstars Tour currently includes the Minisprint class.

Records

Champions

Oval Superstars Tour Wins
All figures correct end of 2019–20 season.

Oval Superstars Minisprint Hall of Fame

Awards and nominations

References

Speedway in New Zealand
Motorsport competitions in New Zealand
Annual sporting events in New Zealand